La Provincia Pavese is an Italian language regional daily newspaper and is the main paper of the province of Pavia.

History and profile
La Provincia Pavese is part of the Gruppo Editoriale L'Espresso through its subsidiary, Finegil, which publishes it. The paper has its headquarters in Pavia.

In 2013 La Provincia Pavese had a circulation of 16,585 copies. The Espresso Group reported that the circulation of the paper was 15,700 copies in 2014.

References

External links
 Official website

GEDI Gruppo Editoriale
Italian-language newspapers
Mass media in Pavia
Daily newspapers published in Italy
Publications established in 1870